Golur is a small village in Mysore district of Karnataka state, India.

Demographics
Golur village has a population of 3,402 people.

Transportation
Golur junction deviates the road from Nanjangud to the T.Narasipur road on the left and the Chamarajanagar road on the right.

Tourism
Golur bridge is a popular picnic spot because of the lush green paddy fields and the small village near the river.  Women of the village wash their colourful clothes from the canal steps.  Farmers walk around with cattle in a blissful and leisurely way.

Image gallery

See also
 Hullahalli

References

Villages in Mysore district